Yudong Station may refer to:

 Yudong Station (Chongqing), a station on the Chongqing Rail Transit in Chongqing.
 Yudong Station (Nanning), a station on the Nanning Rail Transit in Nanning, Guangxi.